State Route 473, also known as SR 473, is a state highway in east-central Arizona, United States, that travels from State Route 260 to Hawley Lake.  Hawley Lake is almost always the coldest place in Arizona.

SR 473 is marked as a spur of SR 73, but while the road itself continues to roughly intersect with that route in Fort Apache, it is not numbered beyond Hawley Lake and therefore does not connect to its parent at all.  SR 473 was actually named as such because the adjacent stretch of SR 260 was formerly part of SR 73.

Route description
SR 473 is a  highway located entirely within the Fort Apache Indian Reservation that links Hawley Lake to SR 260. The southern terminus of the highway is located at the Hawley Lake Dam. The southernmost  of the highway are unpaved. The highway initially heads east along the north side of the lake before curving back towards the northwest away from the lake. It continues to the northwest before going through a series of hairpin turns before heading towards the east. The highway curves back towards the north before taking heading back towards the northeast. The highway curves back to the north as it reaches its northern terminus at SR 260.  Portions of the highway are seasonally closed due to the road becoming impassable during winter weather.

History
The route was defined in 1967 by the Arizona Department of Transportation. Since establishment, no major realignments have occurred.

Junction list

References

External links

SR 473 at Arizona Roads

473
Transportation in Apache County, Arizona
White Mountains (Arizona)